Allophylus aldabricus is a species of plant in the family Sapindaceae. It is endemic to Seychelles.  It is threatened by habitat loss.

References

Flora of Seychelles
aldabricus
Vulnerable plants
Endemic flora of Seychelles
Taxonomy articles created by Polbot